Phanquinone is an organic compound. It is a yellowish solid derived by oxidation of 4,7-phenanthroline.

It has been investigated as both antiprotozoal agent and for its bactericidal activity .

References

Antiprotozoal agents
Phenanthrolines
Quinones
Bipyridines
Enones